Crook O'Lune is a 1953 detective novel by E.C.R. Lorac, the pen name of the British writer Edith Caroline Rivett. It is the thirty eighth in her long-running series featuring Chief Inspector MacDonald of Scotland Yard, one of the more orthodox detectives of the Golden Age of Detective Fiction. It was published in the United States by Doubleday under the alternative title of Shepherd's Crook.

As with several of Lorac's work including Fell Murder and Still Waters, the novel takes place in the Lancashire fell country around Lunesdale where she spent much of her time. The title refers to the Crook o' Lune.

Synopsis
While visiting friends in Lancashire, and looking for a property to settle down in when he retires from Scotland Yard, MacDonald agrees to lend his assistance to investigate some sheep-stealing. Before long he is drawn into a case involving arson, blackmail and attempted murder.

References

Bibliography
 Cooper, John & Pike, B.A. Artists in Crime: An Illustrated Survey of Crime Fiction First Edition Dustwrappers, 1920-1970. Scolar Press, 1995.
 Hubin, Allen J. Crime Fiction, 1749-1980: A Comprehensive Bibliography. Garland Publishing, 1984.
 Nichols, Victoria & Thompson, Susan. Silk Stalkings: More Women Write of Murder. Scarecrow Press, 1998.
 Reilly, John M. Twentieth Century Crime & Mystery Writers. Springer, 2015.

1953 British novels
British mystery novels
Novels by E.C.R. Lorac
Novels set in Lancashire
British detective novels
Collins Crime Club books